Paso de los Libres is a city in the east of the province of Corrientes in the Argentine Mesopotamia.

The city lies on the right-hand (western) shore of the Uruguay River, opposite the city of Uruguaiana, Rio Grande do Sul, Brazil, to which it is joined by a road and railway bridge (Paso de los Libres-Uruguaiana International Bridge). The area is served by Paso de los Libres Airport.

Climate

References

 

Populated places in Corrientes Province
Uruguay River
Corrientes Province
Cities in Argentina
Argentina